William Paul Modibo (born 18 May 1979) is a Cameroonian professional footballer who played as a central defender.

Club career
Born in Ngaoundéré, Modibo played the vast majority of his professional career in Portugal, his first stop being with C.D. Trofense in the third and fourth divisions. In 2006 he helped C.D. Aves promote to the Primeira Liga, only to be immediately relegated back.

After one season in Kuwait, Modibo returned to Portugal with Gil Vicente F.C. However, in the following transfer window, he moved clubs and countries again, signing with Beijing Guoan F.C. He started in most games during the campaign, helping the Chinese capital team win the national championship.

For 2010–11, aged 31, Modibo moved once again to Portugal, signing with modest F.C. Arouca in the second level.

Honours
Beijing Guoan
Chinese Super League: 2009

Lanexang United
Lao Premier League: 2016

References

External links

1979 births
Living people
Cameroonian footballers
Association football defenders
Primeira Liga players
Liga Portugal 2 players
Segunda Divisão players
Cypriot Second Division players
C.D. Trofense players
C.D. Aves players
Gil Vicente F.C. players
F.C. Arouca players
C.D. Tondela players
Negeri Sembilan FA players
Chinese Super League players
Beijing Guoan F.C. players
Doxa Katokopias FC players
Malaysia Super League players
William Modibo
William Modibo
Cameroonian expatriate footballers
Expatriate footballers in Portugal
Expatriate footballers in Kuwait
Expatriate footballers in China
Expatriate footballers in Cyprus
Expatriate footballers in Malaysia
Expatriate footballers in Thailand
Expatriate footballers in Laos
Cameroonian expatriate sportspeople in Portugal
Al Salmiya SC players
Cameroonian expatriate sportspeople in Cyprus
Cameroonian expatriate sportspeople in Laos
Cameroonian expatriate sportspeople in Thailand
Cameroonian expatriate sportspeople in China
Cameroonian expatriate sportspeople in Malaysia
Kuwait Premier League players
G.D. Joane players